Firelight is a 2012 made-for-television drama film that first aired on ABC. The film was directed by Darnell Martin and starred Cuba Gooding Jr. and Q'orianka Kilcher. It told the story of a group of inmates at a facility for female juvenile delinquents who find a new lease on life by becoming volunteer firefighters. Several critics responded to the film favorably and Gooding won the NAACP Image Award for Outstanding Actor in a Television Movie, Mini-Series or Dramatic Special for his performance.

Cast
 Cuba Gooding Jr. as DJ
 Q'orianka Kilcher as Caroline Magabo
 DeWanda Wise as Terry Easle
 Rivka Rivera as Pedra
 Emily Tremaine as Amy Scott
 Sianoa Smit-McPhee as Tammy

References

External links
 

2012 television films
2012 films
2012 drama films
Films directed by Darnell Martin
American drama television films
2010s American films
2010s English-language films